The women's 800 metres event at the 2014 World Junior Championships in Athletics was held in Eugene, Oregon, USA, at Hayward Field on 22, 23 and 24 July.

Medalists

Records

Results

Final
24 July
Start time: 20:01  Temperature: 22 °C  Humidity: 46 %

Intermediate times:
400m: 56.33 Aníta Hinriksdóttir

Semifinals
23 July
First 3 in each heat (Q) and the next 2 fastest (q) advance to the Final

Summary

Details
First 3 in each heat (Q) and the next 2 fastest (q) advance to the Final

Semifinal 1
24 July
Start time: 12:58  Temperature: 16 °C  Humidity: 88%

Intermediate times:
400m: 1:00.76 Aníta Hinriksdóttir

Semifinal 2
24 July
Start time: 13:05  Temperature: 16 °C  Humidity: 88%

Intermediate times:
400m: 1:01.10 Zeyituna Mohammed

Heats
22 July
First 3 in each heat (Q) and the next 4 fastest (q) advance to the Semi-Finals

Summary

Details
First 3 in each heat (Q) and the next 4 fastest (q) advance to the Semi-Finals

Heat 1
24 July
Start time: 12:13  Temperature: 22 °C  Humidity: 53%

Intermediate times:
400m: 59.65 Sarah Schmidt

Heat 2
24 July
Start time: 12:21  Temperature: 22 °C  Humidity: 53%

Intermediate times:
400m: 1:00.25 Alina Ammann

Heat 3
24 July
Start time: 12:28  Temperature: 22 °C  Humidity: 53%

Intermediate times:
400m: 1:00.20 Raevyn Rogers

Heat 4
24 July
Start time: 12:34  Temperature: 22 °C  Humidity: 53%

Intermediate times:
400m: 1:01.74 Margaret Nyairera Wambui

Participation
According to an unofficial count, 29 athletes from 20 countries participated in the event.

References

External links
 WJC14 400 metres schedule

800 metres
800 metres at the World Athletics U20 Championships
2014 in women's athletics